Benny Rubinstein (בני רובינשטיין) is an Israeli former footballer and current real estate developer. He played soccer for Maccabi Netanya and Hapoel Netanya. At the 1969 Maccabiah Games, Rubinstein played soccer for Israel, winning a gold medal.

Biography

Rubinstein was born in Netanya, Israel. His wife is Sarah Rubinstein. Benny's son, Aviram also played football for Maccabi Netanya.

He played soccer for Maccabi Netanya and Hapoel Netanya. At the 1969 Maccabiah Games, Rubinstein played soccer for Israel, winning a gold medal.

Rubinstein then worked as a real estate agent, and now works in real estate development.

Honours
Israeli Premier League (1):
1970-71

References

1952 births
Living people
Association football forwards
Association football midfielders
Competitors at the 1969 Maccabiah Games
Footballers from Netanya
Israeli Jews
Israeli footballers
Jewish footballers
Maccabi Netanya F.C. players
Maccabiah Games competitors for Israel
Maccabiah Games gold medalists for Israel
Hapoel Netanya F.C. players
Real estate and property developers